Nosferattus palmatus is a jumping spider.

Etymology
The epitheton palmatus is Latin for "webbed" and refers to the webbed palpal tibia in dorsal view.

Appearance
Males are 3 mm long, females up to 4 mm.

Distribution
N. palmatus is only known from the State of Sergipe in Brazil.

External links
Three new genera of jumping spider from Brazil (Araneae, Salticidae) (2005)

Sitticini
Spiders of Brazil
Spiders described in 2005